Krisztina Bodri (born 1986) is a beauty queen who represented Hungary in Miss World 2007 in China. She is studying law at University.

References

External links
Bodri Krisztina (in Hungarian)
Krisztina Bodri (in English)

Miss World 2007 delegates
1986 births
Living people
Models from Budapest
Hungarian beauty pageant winners